Sohen Biln (June 17, 1939 – March 27, 2012) was a Canadian rower who competed in the 1958 Commonwealth Games and 1960 Summer Olympics.

He was born in Westlock, Alberta.

In 1960 he was the coxswain of the Canadian boat which won the silver medal in the eights event. At the Commonwealth Games in 1958 he got a silver medal in the coxed fours.

External links
Sohen Biln's profile at Sports Reference.com
Sohen Biln's obituary

1939 births
2012 deaths
Canadian male rowers
Coxswains (rowing)
Olympic rowers of Canada
People from Westlock County
Rowers at the 1960 Summer Olympics
Olympic silver medalists for Canada
Rowers at the 1958 British Empire and Commonwealth Games
Commonwealth Games silver medallists for Canada
Olympic medalists in rowing
Medalists at the 1960 Summer Olympics
Commonwealth Games medallists in rowing
Pan American Games medalists in rowing
Pan American Games silver medalists for Canada
Rowers at the 1959 Pan American Games
Medalists at the 1959 Pan American Games
20th-century Canadian people
Medallists at the 1958 British Empire and Commonwealth Games